Sreedhanya Suresh is an Indian Administrative Service officer. She is the First Tribal Woman from  Kerala to have cleared Civil Services Examination conducted by Union Public Service Commission, India. She secured an all India Rank of 410 in the 2018 UPSC Civil Services Examination. She is currently serving as Sub Collector and Revenue Divisional Officer of Perinthalmanna.

Background
Sreedhanya Suresh belong to Kurichiya tribal family in Wayanad, Kerala. Her parents, Suresh and Kamala are daily wage labourers who trade in bows and arrows in the local market. As a child growing up in an unfinished house, she did not have access to the basic amenities of life. She grew up in the Ambalkkolly tribal settlement in Wayanad district. A leaking roof and even clothes lined up to make do for walls in the house do not deter Sreedhanya from her being a good student during her schooldays. In spite of all the difficulties and poverty, education remained a priority and this proved fruitful for the whole family.

Motivation
Dignitaries like P. Sathasivam, Pinarai Vijayan, Rahul Gandhi, Priyanka Gandhi, and many others around the country congratulated  her for her success in the examination.

References

Year of birth missing (living people)
Living people
Indian Administrative Service officers
District magistrate
Civil Servants from Kerala